Fletcher Aluminium Ltd v O'Sullivan [2001] 2 NZLR 731 is a cited case in New Zealand regarding that a restrictive covenant in a business sale may be enforceable even if there is no goodwill involved.

Background
O'Sullivan developed some aluminum windows. Fletcher Aluminium, interested in the designs, entered into an agreement with him to purchase the designs for $1.7 million, as well as giving him a job as a franchise manager. Part of the agreement included a restraint of trade clause.

Later, O'Sullivan undertook employment from a rival firm, and Fletchers sought to enforce the restraint of trade agreement.

Held
The court granted the restraint of trade injunction.

References

Court of Appeal of New Zealand cases
New Zealand contract case law
2001 in case law
2001 in New Zealand law